The Cluan Immorrais is a 15th-century Irish battle that pitted the Kingdom of Uí Failghe against the Galls of Meath. The battle was fought in 1406, and Uí Falighe was victorious.

References

1406 in Ireland
Cluain Immorrais
Cluain Immorrais
Cluain Immorrais